Dennis Shepherd (11 October 1926 – 12 June 2006) was a South African boxer who won the silver medal in the featherweight division at the 1948 Summer Olympics in London. Shepherd died at age 79 in Lichtenburg.

1948 Olympic results
Below is the record of Dennis Shepherd, a South African featherweight boxer who competed at the 1948 London Olympics:

 Round of 32: Defeated Sydney Greve (Pakistan) on points
 Round of 16: Defeated Mohamed Ammi (France) on points
 Quarterfinal: Defeated Eddie Johnson (United States) on points
 Semifinal: Defeated Francisco Nunez (Argentina) on points
 Final: Lost to Ernesto Formenti (Italy) on points (was awarded silver medal)

Shepherd continued to box as an amateur until 1950 when he was eliminated in the opening round of the British Empire Games in Auckland, New Zealand. He subsequently retired from boxing without having embarked on a professional career.

External links
profile

1926 births
2006 deaths
Boxers from Johannesburg
Featherweight boxers
Boxers at the 1948 Summer Olympics
Olympic boxers of South Africa
Olympic silver medalists for South Africa
Olympic medalists in boxing
Medalists at the 1948 Summer Olympics
Boxers at the 1950 British Empire Games
Commonwealth Games competitors for South Africa
South African male boxers